Alan David McGilvray  (6 December 190917 July 1996) was an Australian cricketer who played several first-class seasons for New South Wales in the mid-1930s before becoming the doyen of Australian cricket commentators. He became identified as the voice of Australian cricket through his ABC radio broadcasts.

Biography
McGilvray was born in Paddington, a suburb of Sydney, one of four children of Dumfries-born Thomas McGilvray, owner of a city shoe warehouse. The family were keen on cricket: "he played as a child in New South Wales with his father, Thomas, bowling to him, and his brother Norman keeping wicket behind the kerosene can." He was educated at Newington College (1923–24) and Sydney Grammar School. He captained New South Wales in the 1935–36 and 1936–37 seasons.

His radio commentary career spanned over 50 years, starting in an era where the only communications between England and Australia were ball-by-ball telegraph cables which were embellished with sound effects and commentary to give an impression of being at the game. The technique was first used in 1934 and became known as synthetic cricket broadcasts. By the 1938 Ashes series in England, short wave reception to Australia had improved significantly and commentary started moving to conventional broadcasting. McGilvray called every Test in Australia from the Second World War until his retirement in 1985.

An example of his distinctive commentary style is as follows:
Farnes turns, runs in bowling to Bradman, it's a ball well-pitched. Bradman moves forward, drives, Compton at cover tries to cut it off, he's beaten by the pace of the ball and it races away for another four. APPLAUSE. Four more to Bradman, taking his score to 101, a century in 130 minutes, a glorious innings by us and Australia is now building herself into a very sound position, assisted by a great knock by Bradman.

As well as editing numerous ABC Cricket Books, McGilvray wrote a number of cricket books himself including:
The Game is Not the Same (1985) 
The Game Goes On (1987) 
Alan McGilvray's Backpage of Cricket (1989)
Alan McGilvray – a Lifetime in Cricket 
Captains of the Game (1992).

During the 1970s, when "traditional" cricket was in stiff competition with Kerry Packer's "World Series" initiative, ABC radio's cricket commentary featured a musical jingle whose words were "The game is not the same without McGilvray".

McGilvray was appointed a Member of the Order of the British Empire (MBE) in 1974 and a Member of the Order of Australia (AM) in 1980. On his retirement in 1985 at the Sydney Cricket Ground, the Prime Minister Bob Hawke made a farewell speech after which McGilvray received a standing ovation from the crowd.

He died in Darlinghurst, Sydney, in 1996, aged 86.

See also
 List of cricket commentators

Notes

External links

References

1909 births
1996 deaths
New South Wales cricketers
Cricketers from New South Wales
Australian cricket commentators
People educated at Newington College
People educated at Sydney Grammar School
Members of the Order of Australia
Australian Members of the Order of the British Empire
D. G. Bradman's XI cricketers
Australian cricketers
Sport Australia Hall of Fame inductees